The International Network of Genocide Scholars (INoGS) is a non-profit and non-partisan organization dedicated to fostering scholarly multi-disciplinary exchange and academic debate in the field of genocide studies.

The INoGS was founded on 14 January 2005 in Berlin. INoGS is open to researchers, teachers and students from all academic disciplines working on genocide and mass violence, and has worked closely with academic institutions such as the Centre for the Study of Genocide and Mass Violence.

Since 2005, the Journal of Genocide Research is the official journal of the INoGS. The INoGS regularly organizes and sponsors international conferences and workshops on the subject of genocide studies.

Executive committee
 Elisabeth Hope Murray, Embry-Riddle University in USA, President
Mohamed Adhikari, University of Cape Town vice-president.
 Raz Segal, Stockton University USA, Executive Secretary 
 Rachel E. McGinnis Rochester Institute of Technology USA, vice executive secretary.

References

External links
Official website
Journal of Genocide Research

Genocide research and prevention organisations
Non-profit organisations based in Berlin
International learned societies
Organizations established in 2005